Hush Puppies is an American brand of casual footwear.  A division of Wolverine World Wide, Hush Puppies is headquartered in Rockford, Michigan. Wolverine also licenses the Hush Puppies name for apparel, toys and accessories.

Hush Puppies uses a basset hound named Jason as its logo; basset hounds are occasionally referred to as "hush puppies" for this reason.

History 

The Hush Puppies brand was founded in 1958 following extensive work by Wolverine to develop a practical method of pigskin tanning for the US military to use in gloves and other protective materials. Pigskin was soft and flexible, but not tough enough to be used in Wolverine's work boots; the company developed a pair of casual shoes from the pigskin to market as a comfort brand. The casual lifestyle positioning appealed to the growing post-war suburbia in the United States; by mid-1959 the company had produced its first million pairs and by 1963 one in ten adults in the United States owned a pair of Hush Puppies.

1990s resurgence
In 1994, when sales were down to 30,000 pairs a year, Hush Puppies suddenly became hip in the clubs and bars of downtown Manhattan where young people were buying them at small shoe stores. Fashion designers John Bartlett, Anna Sui, and Joel Fitzpatrick began featuring them in their collections; the shoes were soon worn by celebrities such as Kenneth Clarke, Princess Diana, Jim Carrey, Sharon Stone, David Bowie, Tom Hanks, Ellen DeGeneres and Sylvester Stallone.

Hush Puppies also benefited from the trend toward dressing-down at work, filling the fashion gap between sneakers and dress shoes. Depending on word of mouth, Wolverine sold 430,000 pairs of the shoes in 1995, and four times that the following year. Hush Puppies won the prize for best accessory at the Council of Fashion Designers awards dinner in 1995.

Hush Puppies' rapid rise in popularity was used as an example of a tipping point by journalist Malcolm Gladwell.

In popular culture
Hush Puppies claimed their rubber soles saved the life of Rolling Stones guitarist Keith Richards when he accidentally touched his guitar against an ungrounded microphone at a 1965 concert in Sacramento, California. Richards was knocked unconscious, but medics believed that the crepe-soled Hush Puppies shoes he was wearing insulated him and saved his life.

Hush Puppy shoes are referenced in a number of songs, including Jimmy Buffett's "Come Monday", Oran "Juice" Jones's "The Rain", and Pete Townshend's "Rough Boys".

Mikhail Gorbachev invited the brand to be the first American company to do business in the Soviet Union.

The shoes were worn by Forrest Gump in the movie Forrest Gump.

References

External links
 —Hush Puppies.com
 Spokane Daily Chronicle—late 1960s newspaper ad for Bozos oxfords - 1968-11-14 - p. 43

1958 establishments in Michigan
American brands
American companies established in 1958
Companies based in Kent County, Michigan
Manufacturing companies based in Michigan
Clothing companies established in 1958
Shoe brands
Wolverine World Wide
1950s fashion
1990s fashion